Bidibidi Refugee Settlement is a refugee camp in northwestern Uganda. With over 270,000 South Sudanese refugees fleeing the ongoing civil war, as of early 2017 it was the largest refugee settlement in the world. As of 2018, that distinction was claimed by Kutupalong refugee camp for displaced Rohingya in Bangladesh. Bidibidi refugee resettlement is found in yumbe district.

Geography
The Bidibidi  area covers 250 square kilometers of the eastern half of Yumbe District, stretching southward from the South Sudanese border and spilling over into Moyo District along the western bank of the Kochi River. Bidibidi is divided into zones. It has five zones namely: 

 bidibidi zone one
 Swinga zone two
 Yoyo zone three
 Zone 4 (Abrimajo and Annex)
 Ariwa zone five

The Bidibidi area was a small village before becoming a refugee settlement which was opened in August 2016. Since then, the Uganda government and other NGOs have worked to create a settlement rather than a camp to host and contain the influx of the growing number of the asylum seekers from South Sudan. It has very quickly become the second largest refugee camp in the world. Formerly a huge, empty, arid patch of land nearby the small Ugandan border town of Yumbe, today it is home to some 270,000 refugees, most of whom have fled the violence and upheaval in South Sudan.

Schools 

Twajiji primary school Education
Lodonga Primary Teachers
Yangani Primary School
Balakara Primary School
Knowledge Land primary school 
Kado Primary School
Valley view secondary school
Bright ecd
Daddys care ecd
Rock land ecd
Green valley ecd
Kado Secondary School
Kijebere primary school
Molondo primary school
Alaba primary school
Kenavally primary school
Kodeje primary school
Excel international secondary school
yoyo central primary school
Nipata valley primary school
Nipata secondary school
High land primary school
Abriamajo primary school
Happy child friendly space
Luzira Bright view primary school

Health care 
There have been growing concerns about health conditions and access to health services as the number of South Sudan refugees entering Uganda continues to increase, particularly, Bidi Bidi refugee camp, with Reuters reporting that about 180 refugees (nearly half of them young children) died in Bidibidi Refugee Settlement in the first six months of 2017. This is compounded by how there is often limited accuracy of health measurements in camp settings, with under-reporting of deaths by humanitarian organizations typically occurring more frequently than over-reporting of deaths.

From a human rights and ethics perspective, there are also questions about whether people with different physical abilities or the elderly are not being prioritized in these settlements, receiving less resources compared to younger, able-bodied residents in good health. In settlements located in the Ayilo District of Northern Uganda, for example, the organization Caritas reports that programs have been designed to provide more assistance for building latrines to groups identified as vulnerable, such as older residents, disabled residents, and child-headed households.

Furthermore, a 2016 U.S. State Department report on trafficking warns that South Sudanese children in Northern Ugandan refugee settlements may be vulnerable to trafficking, with the UNHCR suspecting that instances of trafficking are already occurring among young South Sudanese refugees. Unfortunately, reliably quantifying the number of trafficked children can be a challenge due to lack of effective monitoring, corruption, insufficient protection of victims to come forward, differences in definitions of terms, and other contextual aspects.

Hospitals 
Bidibidi has a number of hospitals and clinics that are aiding on the health of refugees in Yumbe.
 Bidibidi Health Center 3 
 Bolomoni Health Centre 3
 Igamara Health Centre 3
 Swinga Health Center 3
 Yayari Health Centre 3
 Yangani Health Centre 3
 Koro Health Health Centre 3
 Iyete Health Centre 3
 Yoyo Health Center 3
 Luzira Health Centre 3
 Twajiji Health Center 3
 Ariwa Health Centre 3
 Okuban Health Centre 3
 Ayivu Health Centre 3
 Bangatuti health centre 3
 Komgbe health centre 3

Farming in the refugee camp 
Refugees and host community participate in farming in the settlements and host community land respectively, they are sometimes provided seeds by humanitarian organisations.

The land refugees farm on is provided by the government and the UNHCR.

Media House in the refugee camp 
Reliable Refugee Stories Association has engaged both the refugee youth and the host community in storytelling, content writing, newsletter production and documentaries to advocate for the welfare of the people in West Nile region and Uganda at large

References 

Refugee camps in Uganda
Yumbe District